Walnut Grove Farm may refer to the following places in the United States:

Walnut Grove Farm (Knoxville, Illinois), listed on the National Register of Historic Places in Illinois
Walnut Groves Farm, Bloomfield, Kentucky, listed on the National Register of Historic Places listings in Nelson County, Kentucky
Walnut Grove Farm (Shawsville, Virginia), listed on the National Register of Historic Places in Montgomery County, Virginia